Isaiah 26 is the twenty-sixth chapter of the Book of Isaiah in the Hebrew Bible or the Old Testament of the Christian Bible. This book contains the prophecies attributed to the prophet Isaiah, and is one of the Books of the Prophets. Chapters 24–27 of Isaiah constitute one continuous poetical prophecy, sometimes called the "Isaiah Apocalypse".

Text 
The original text was written in Hebrew language. This chapter is divided into 21 verses.

Textual witnesses
Some early manuscripts containing the text of this chapter in Hebrew are of the Masoretic Text tradition, which includes the Codex Cairensis (895), the Petersburg Codex of the Prophets (916), Aleppo Codex (10th century), Codex Leningradensis (1008).

Fragments containing parts of this chapter were found among the Dead Sea Scrolls (3rd century BC or later):
 1QIsaa: complete
 1QIsab: extant: verses 1–5
 4QIsab (4Q56): extant: verses 1–5, 7–19

There is also a translation into Koine Greek known as the Septuagint, made in the last few centuries BCE. Extant ancient manuscripts of the Septuagint version include Codex Vaticanus (B; B; 4th century), Codex Sinaiticus (S; BHK: S; 4th century), Codex Alexandrinus (A; A; 5th century) and Codex Marchalianus (Q; Q; 6th century).

Parashot
The parashah sections listed here are based on the Aleppo Codex. Isaiah 26 is a part of the Prophecies about Judah and Israel (Isaiah 24–35). {P}: open parashah; {S}: closed parashah.
 {S} 26:1–10 {P} 26:11 {S} 26:12 {S} 26:13–15 {P} 26:16–19 {P} 26:20–21 {P}

A song of salvation (26:1–6)
This section contains a psalm-like poem concerning a purified Jerusalem.

God’s people anticipate vindication (26:7–21)
Verses 7–19 contain a so-called 'community lament', generally to entreat 'YHWH's favour at a time of distress' (cf. Psalm 74; 79), here describing 'the faithful community under alien rule, but still expressing its confidence that deliverance will come'.

Verses 20–21 form a link between the preceding lament and the material in the next chapter.

Verse 19
 Thy dead men shall live, together with my dead body shall they arise.
 Awake and sing, ye that dwell in dust: for thy dew is as the dew of herbs, and the earth shall cast out the dead.
"Thy dead men shall live": or "May Your dead live", is the opposite of what is written in  where the prayer is that "the wicked should not live, slackers shall not rise", but here is that "the righteous should live", that is, the corpses of God's people, 'who made themselves corpses' for God's sake, shall rise.

See also
Judah
Related Bible parts: Isaiah 2, Isaiah 24, Isaiah 25, Isaiah 27, Jeremiah 48, Revelation 19, Revelation 21

References

Sources

External links

Jewish
Isaiah 26 Hebrew with Parallel English
Yeshayahu - Isaiah - Chapter 26 in the Complete Jewish Bible (Hebrew/English) with Rashi's Commentary

Christian
Isaiah 26 English Translation with Parallel Latin Vulgate

26